The Taipei Metro Daqiaotou station is a station on the Xinzhuang Line located in Datong District, Taipei, Taiwan. It is the last station before the Luzhou Line diverges from the Xinzhuang Line. It is a planned terminus for the Shezi Light Rail Line.

Station overview
This four-level, underground station has an island platform. It is located beneath the intersection of Minquan West Rd., Chongqing South Rd., and the south side of Daqiao Elementary School Stadium. It opened for service on 3 November 2010 with the opening of the Luzhou Branch Line and the Taipei City section of the Xinzhuang Line.

History
Originally, plans for the Xinzhuang Line did not include a station in the Daqiaotou (大橋頭) area. However, as part of the city government's urban renewal policy, the area around the station was zoned for redevelopment and revitalization. Thus, in October 2007, it was announced that a new station would be added - Daqiao Elementary School Station. Shortly before the opening of the line, the station name was changed to Daqiaotou station to reflect the station's historical significance.

Design
The station has a light roof, glass curtain walls, and an arc ceiling. Interior station design is themed "Tales of an Important Bridge" (referring to Taipei Bridge) and features the Tamsui River, Dihua Street marketplace, and historic Daqiao Elementary School.

Construction
Excavation depth for this station is 32 meters deep. It is 158 meters in length and 19.85 meters wide. It has three entrances, one accessibility elevator, and two vent shafts. The entrances connect with existing pedestrian underpasses and two joint development buildings.

During construction, an 85-year-old red arched gate was temporarily removed. A swimming pool and students' play facilities were also demolished for station construction. The historic gate has since been moved back to its original position, and new swimming and play facilities have been constructed.

Station layout

Exits
Exit 1: Minquan W. Rd., Lane 225 
Exit 2: Northwest side of the intersection of Minquan W. Rd. and Chongqing N. Rd.
Exit 3: Chongqing N. Rd. Sec. 3, beside the Daqiao Elementary School

Around the station
 Ama Museum
 Taiwan New Cultural Movement Memorial Hall
 Daqiao Elementary School
 Minquan Junior High School
 Yongle Elementary School
 Taiping Elementary School
 Daojiang High School of Commerce
 Taipei Bridge
 Yansan Night Market
 Daqiao Police Station
 Daqiao Market
 Taipei Bridge Post Office
 CPC Corporation, Minquan West Rd. Gas Station
 Council of Indigenous Peoples

References

2010 establishments in Taiwan
Railway stations opened in 2010
Zhonghe–Xinlu line stations